The 1974 South Carolina United States Senate election was held on November 5, 1974 to select the U.S. Senator from the state of South Carolina.  Incumbent Democratic Senator Fritz Hollings easily defeated Republican challenger Gwen Bush to win his third (his second full) term.

Primaries
Both Fritz Hollings and Gwen Bush faced no opposition in their party's primaries which allowed both candidates to concentrate solely on the general election.

General election campaign
The Watergate scandal caused the Republicans to perform poorly nationwide in 1974 and Gwen Bush was little more than a sacrificial lamb.  The main focus of the voters in South Carolina was on the competitive gubernatorial contest and Fritz Hollings easily cruised to a comfortable re-election.

General election results

 

|-
| 
| colspan=5 |Democratic hold
|-

See also
List of United States senators from South Carolina
United States Senate elections, 1974 and 1975
United States House of Representatives elections in South Carolina, 1974
South Carolina gubernatorial election, 1974

References

South Carolina
1974
1974 South Carolina elections